The Rolandas Kalinauskas RK-7 Orange (also called the Muse, Fly and Bite) is a Lithuanian ultralight aircraft, designed and produced by Rolandas Kalinauskas, of Prienai. The aircraft is supplied as a kit for amateur construction or as a complete ready-to-fly-aircraft and has been noted for its very low price.

Design and development
A simplified single-seat version of the Rolandas Kalinauskas RK-6 Magic, the RK-7 was designed to comply with the Fédération Aéronautique Internationale microlight rules. It features a strut-braced high wing, a single-seat enclosed cockpit under a bubble canopy, fixed tricycle landing gear and a single engine in pusher configuration.

The aircraft forward fuselage is made from welded steel with a wooden laminate covering in the cockpit area, with the tailboom made from aluminum tube. The tail surfaces are built up from aluminum tubing, strut-braced, covered in Dacron sailcloth and protected with a small tailskid. The wings are wooden and equipped with Junkers style ailerons. The standard engine available is the  Rotax 503 two-stroke powerplant, although the  Rotax 447 has also been used. The aircraft can be flown without the canopy fitted, if desired.

The RK-7 has been noted for its low retail price. In 2011 it was advertised at €11,000 for an assembled, ready-to-fly  aircraft and €6,500 for a kit.

Specifications (RK-7 Orange)

References

External links

2000s Lithuanian ultralight aircraft
Single-engined pusher aircraft